Night Terrace is a scripted science fiction audio comedy produced by Splendid Chaps Productions. Originally released as a paid digital download in 2014, the first two seasons have been broadcast on BBC Radio 4 Extra since 2019.

The show stars Jackie Woodburne as Dr Anastasia Black, a "science hero" whose retirement from the mysterious "D.E.P.A.R.T.M.E.N.T." is cut short when her Melbourne terrace house unexpectedly starts to travel through space and time. She is joined by student and door-to-door electricity plan salesman Eddie Jones (Ben McKenzie) and, later, fellow ex-D.E.P.A.R.T.M.E.N.T. agent Susan Denholm (Petra Elliott). The first season won the Convenor's Award for Excellence at the 2014 Aurealis Awards.

Crowdfunding
Each season so far has been primarily funded through Kickstarter campaigns.
Season 1 met its base funding target plus two stretch goals which allowed The Making of Night Terrace documentary and The Adventures of Eddie mini-series to be created. Season 2 met its base funding target plus one stretch goal, which allowed a Live episode to be created where backers and friends of the production became part of the episode as the live audience. Season 3 met its base funding target plus two stretch goals which allow The Night Terrace Summer Special (a digital book collection of stories, trivia and puzzles in the style of TV annuals and comic books) and a mini-series revealing the untold adventures of Sue to be made.

Companion Podcast
To accompany the broadcast of Night Terrace on BBC Radio 4 Extra Vaya Pashos, of the Neighbours recap podcast Neighbuzz, hosted a companion podcast (alongside Woodburne the show has had past and present Neighbours stars in guest roles). Each episode featured members of the cast and crew discussing the episode just broadcast, the show in general, and answering fan questions.

Cast

Regular cast
Jackie Woodburne – Dr Anastasia Black
Ben McKenzie – Eddie Jones
Petra Elliott – Sue | The Borealian Commander | Dr Housen
 David Lamb – various
 Amanda Buckley – various

Guest cast
 Adam Richard - (Discoworld)
 Alan Brough - Barry (Sound & Fuhrer)
 Andrew McClelland - The Colonel / Mr Bell (Time of Death)
 Cal Wilson - Vraxnall (Moving House)
 Celia Pacquola - (The Edification of Anastasia Black)
 Chris Taylor - The Captain (Starship Australis)
 Colette Mann - The Tea Lady (Sense & Susceptibility)
 Emily Taheny - (The Edification of Anastasia Black)
 Francis Greenslade - Morrie (Starship Australis)
 Ian Smith - Bunny (Sense & Susceptibility)
 Jane Badler - (Home) | (Things That Go Bump in the Night Terrace)
 Lawrence Leung - (Things That Go Bump in the Night Terrace)
 Louise Jameson - Marjorie (Sense & Susceptibility)
 Steven Gates - (Situational Awareness)
 Tegan Higginbotham - (Situational Awareness)
 Toby Truslove - Vraxnall (Moving House) | The Hostile Takeover Commander (The Outsourcing)
 Virginia Gay - Miss Liaina Baker (Time of Death)
 Aahmer Rahman - Tony (The Outsourcing)
 Andrew Hansen - (The Edification of Anastasia Black) | (The Retirement of Horatio Gray) | (Home Again)
 Brianna Williams - (Ancient History)
 Cate Wolfe - The Human Commander (Moving House) | Carol (The Outsourcing)
 Eryn Saunders - (The Last Hunt) | (Situational Awareness)
 Gary Russell - Charles (Sense & Susceptibility)
 George Ivanoff - (A Verb of Nouns)
 Gnarnayarrahe Waitairie - (The Last Hunt)
 Jason Tamiru - (The Last Hunt)
 John Clarke - Mr King (Sense & Susceptibility)
 Kevin Powe - (A Verb of Nouns)
 Laura Hughes - (The Edification of Anastasia Black)
 Lee Zachariah - Vraxnall (Moving House)
 Michael F Cahill - (A Verb of Nouns)
 Ming-Zhu Hii (Full Steam)
 Naomi Rukavina - The Story Teller (The Last Hunt) | (Discoworld)
 Phil Zachariah - The Hitlers (Sound & Fuhrer)
 Samantha Streeter - Voice of the Toy / SquidgyPiggy (Sound & Fuhrer)

Additional Voices
 Nicholas Briggs - Moving House
 Virginia Gay - Moving House | Home
 Aahmer Rahman - Starship Australis
 Allan Carey - Sense & Susceptibility | Time of Death
 Andrew Hansen - Moving House | Ancient History
 Andrew Waddington - Starship Australis | The Outsourcing | Sense & Susceptibility 
 Anniene Stockton - Time of Death | The Outsourcing
 Brianna Williams - Sense & Susceptibility | Full Steam
 Daniel Sullivan - The Outsourcing
 David Ashton - Moving House | The Outsourcing | Full Steam | A Verb of Nouns
 Glenn Greening - Starship Australis
 Graeme Callaghan - The Outsourcing | Sense & Susceptibility | Full Steam
 John Richards - Full Steam
 Karen Pickering - Moving House | Discoworld
 Kevin Powe - Home | Ancient History | The Retirement of Horatio Gray
 Kyle Threlfo - Sense & Susceptibility
 Michael F Cahill - Sense & Susceptibility
 Michael Ward - Moving House
 Richard Schipper - Sense & Susceptibility | Full Steam | The Retirement of Horatio Gray
 Sam(antha) Streeter - A Verb of Nouns | The Retirement of Horatio Gray
 Stephen Hall - Sense & Susceptibility
 Steven Petrenko - The Outsourcing
 Tony Flynn - The Outsourcing

Hello My Name is Eddie
Ben McKenzie – Eddie Jones
Petra Elliott – Sue
 Perri Cummings - Professor Brenda
 Noah Moon - The Time Traveller
 David Ashton - The Office Worker
 Lee Zachariah - Shop Assistant
 John Richards - Shop Assistant
 George Ivanoff - Wiliams
 Brianna Williams - Gilbert | Rebecca
 Lisa-Skye - Claudia
 Amanda Buckley - Jamie

Episodes

Season 1

Season 2

Season 3
TBA in May 2020 (estimated release date)

Bonus Episodes

The Making of Night Terrace
Narrated and produced by Josh Kinal, this episode is 27:27 long. It features interviews with all the main cast and creators of Night Terrace.

Hello My Name is Eddie

Horatio's Travels

Night Your Own Terrace
The Night Your Own Terrace mini-episodes were written for backers at the Night Producer or Choose-Your-Own-Night Terrace level of their Kickstarter campaign for Season 2. The backers provided the writers with personal writing prompts & all of Jackie Woodburne's lines were recorded months in advance, providing a feeling of deja-vu across the episodes (both overt and covert).

The Adventures of Sue
TBA in May 2020 (estimated release date)

References

Australian radio programs
Australian radio dramas
Australian radio comedy